Ju Hui (born 4 November 1989) is a Korean handball goalkeeper for Seoul City and the South Korean national team.

She participated at the 2011 World Women's Handball Championship in Brazil and the 2012 Summer Olympics.

References

External links

1989 births
Living people
South Korean female handball players
Handball players at the 2012 Summer Olympics
Olympic handball players of South Korea
Universiade medalists in handball
Handball players from Seoul
Universiade silver medalists for South Korea
Medalists at the 2015 Summer Universiade
Handball players at the 2020 Summer Olympics